Adam Smelczyński (14 September 1930 – 14 June 2021) was a Polish trap shooter who competed at six Olympics between 1956 and 1976, winning one silver medal in 1956. He was born in Częstochowa, Poland.

Along with Bill McMillan, he was the second shooter to compete at six Olympics, after Frans Lafortune (the Theofilakis brothers Alexandros and Ioannis competed at six Olympics only if the unofficial 1906 Games are counted). He came third in trap shooting at the World Championships in 1967. He won the European trap shooting championships in 1972 and 1976, and came third in 1974 and 1975.

See also
 List of athletes with the most appearances at Olympic Games

References

External links
 
 
 
 

1930 births
2021 deaths
Polish male sport shooters
Trap and double trap shooters
Shooters at the 1956 Summer Olympics
Shooters at the 1960 Summer Olympics
Shooters at the 1964 Summer Olympics
Shooters at the 1968 Summer Olympics
Shooters at the 1972 Summer Olympics
Shooters at the 1976 Summer Olympics
Olympic shooters of Poland
Olympic silver medalists for Poland
Sportspeople from Częstochowa
Sportspeople from Silesian Voivodeship
Medalists at the 1956 Summer Olympics
Olympic medalists in shooting